Francois Jakobus 'Frans' Viljoen (born 22 October 1982) is a South African rugby union footballer who plays as a loose forward.

Career

Only 13 July 2013 it was announced that Viljoen would join French side Lyon.

References

Living people
1982 births
South African rugby union players
Rugby union flankers
Cheetahs (rugby union) players
Griquas (rugby union) players
Free State Cheetahs players
Leopards (rugby union) players
Griffons (rugby union) players
Stade Français players
Aironi players
Rugby union number eights
Afrikaner people
People from Ficksburg
Alumni of Grey College, Bloemfontein
Rugby union players from the Free State (province)